Gyula Rubinek de Zsitvabesenyő (10 September 1865 – 8 January 1922) was a Hungarian politician, who served as Minister of Agriculture between 1919 and 1920. He was also Minister of Trade from 19 July to 16 December 1920. Rubinek was the creator of the land reform which connected to István Szabó de Nagyatád.

References
 Magyar Életrajzi Lexikon (in Hungarian)	

1865 births
1922 deaths
People from Nové Zámky District
Agriculture ministers of Hungary